Reykjanes is a small headland on the southwestern tip of the Reykjanes Peninsula in Iceland, giving the main peninsula its name.

As the name means "smoking peninsula" connected to volcanic activity, there are also other peninsulas by this name in Iceland, e.g. the peninsula of Reykjanes in Ísafjarðardjúp.

References

External links
 Catalogue of Icelandic Volcanoes - Reykjanes

 
Headlands of Iceland
Black sand beaches